Damian Waniczek (born 18 February 1981 in Szczyrk) is a Polish luger who has competed since the late 1990s. A natural track luger, he won four bronze medals in the men's doubles event at the FIL World Luge Natural Track Championships (2000, 2005, 2009, 2011).

Waniczek also won two medals in the men's doubles event at the FIL European Luge Natural Track Championships with a silver in 2010 and a bronze in 2002.

References
FIL-Luge profile

Natural track World Championships results: 1979-2007

External links 

 

1981 births
Living people
Polish male lugers
People from Bielsko County
Sportspeople from Silesian Voivodeship